Daryl Jones (born June 25, 1987 in Royal Oak, Michigan) is a retired American professional baseball outfielder.

Jones attended Spring High School in Spring, Texas, where he was a football prospect as well as a baseball prospect. Jones was rated as one of the top position prospects at the 2005 Pre-Draft Showcase, where he also showed off his pitching ability.

Jones was drafted by the St. Louis Cardinals in the third round (110th overall) of the 2005 Major League Baseball Draft. He turned down a scholarship offer with Rice University to sign with the Cardinals for a $450,000 bonus. After struggling in Class A with the Swing of the Quad Cities in 2006 and 2007, Jones hit .326 in 2008 and was named the Cardinals' minor league player of the year while playing with the Class A Advanced Palm Beach Cardinals. In 2009, he was named the Cardinals seventh best prospect, and was chosen to represent the Cardinals in the All-Star Futures Game. However, he played in the Futures game while not fully recovered from a quad injury and re-injured himself in the game, setting back his career prospects.

After the 2011 season, Jones became a free agent and signed with the Cincinnati Reds, receiving an invitation to spring training. In 27 games with the AAA Louisville Bats, he hit only .187 and he was released on July 5.

References

External links

1987 births
Living people
Sportspeople from Royal Oak, Michigan
Baseball players from Michigan
Baseball players from Texas
Baseball outfielders
Johnson City Cardinals players
Swing of the Quad Cities players
Palm Beach Cardinals players
Springfield Cardinals players
Memphis Redbirds players
Louisville Bats players